Woubi Chéri (English: Darling Woubi) is a 1998 French/Ivorian documentary that shows a few days in the life of various members of the gay and transgender community in Abidjan, Côte d'Ivoire. It is one of a very few films from Africa to deal with LGBT issues.

The title comes from the term "woubi", meaning a man who plays the role of a wife in a homosexual relationship. Also featured in the documentary are "yossis", men who act as husbands to woubis, who are often bisexual and also in conventional marriages. The film won Best Documentary awards at the New York Lesbian, Gay, Bisexual, & Transgender Film Festival, the Turin International Lesbian & Gay Film Festival, and the Transgender Festival in London.

See also
Dakan — a 1997 Guinean drama film dealing with homosexuality
Forbidden Fruit — a 2000 Zimbabwean film about a lesbian relationship

References

External links
 

1998 LGBT-related films
1998 films
French documentary films
1990s French-language films
French LGBT-related films
Ivorian documentary films
Ivorian LGBT-related films
Documentary films about LGBT topics
1998 documentary films
1990s French films